Emu berry is a common name for several Australian plants and may refer to:

Grewia latifolia, endemic to Northern and Eastern Australia
Grewia retusifolia
Podocarpus drouynianus, native to Western Australia